Motamadiyeh (also Romanized as Mo‘tamadīyeh) is a village in Takht-e Jolgeh Rural District, in the Central District of Firuzeh County, Razavi Khorasan Province, Iran. At the 2006 census, its population was 611, in 148 families.

References 

Populated places in Firuzeh County